Daya is the debut extended play (EP) by American singer Daya. It was released on September 4, 2015, through Artbeatz, Z Entertainment, and RED Distribution. The EP was made available to stream one day before its release on Billboard. A physical version of the EP was released exclusively to Target on October 30, 2015. All of the songs featured on the EP appeared on Daya's debut studio album, Sit Still, Look Pretty (2016).

Background 
In an interview with Billboards Jason Lipshutz, Daya said about the EP "Each song on this EP has a piece of my heart, and I really hope that my fans can find pieces of themselves in it, too."

Critical reception 
Matt Collar of AllMusic stated "The debut EP from Grace Tandon a.k.a. Daya showcases the Pittsburgh native's bright, soulful vocals and electronic-tinged sound. Though only 16 years old at the time of the EP's release, Daya commands the mike with a highly resonant vocal style that fits nicely next to more established R&B artists like Beyoncé, as well as similarly inclined contemporaries like Lorde. Working with producer and songwriter Gino Barletta, Daya delivers a handful of empowering, passionate anthems that also work well on the dancefloor." Billboards Jason Lipshutz said "[Daya] displays the young artist's musicianship and knack for straightforward, emotionally revealing lyrics."

Singles 
"Hide Away" was released as the lead single from the EP on April 22, 2015. Since its release, it has peaked at number 23 on the Billboard Hot 100, and has been certified Platinum by the RIAA.

"Sit Still, Look Pretty" was released to Top 40 radio as the second single from the EP on March 29, 2016. It has since peaked at number 28 on the Hot 100, and has been certified Gold by the RIAA.

Track listing 

Notes
  signifies a vocal producer.
 "U12" is a stylization of "You Want To".

Charts

Weekly charts

Year-end charts

Release history

References 

2015 debut EPs
Daya (singer) albums